Polyommatus thersites, the Chapman's blue, is a butterfly in the family Lycaenidae. It is found in southern Europe, Morocco, Lebanon, Asia Minor, Iran and across the Palearctic to Siberia and Tian Shan.

It is a small butterfly with both generation dimorphism and  sexual dimorphism. For the first generation the upperside is blue with grey hind-wings and in the female a sub-marginal line of orange spots. The summer generation of the female is brown with the same sub-marginal line of orange spots while they are absent in the lighter male.

Representatives of both sexes have in the spring generation grey-colored hindwing undersides while (sandy brown in the summer generation). 

The underside is ochre marked with black dots circled in white and decorated with a sub-marginal line of orange spots. The forewing underside is yellow grey in summer females.

Polyommatus thersites is similar to Polyommatus icarus, but they are smaller and both sexes have no basal spots on the underside of the forewing .

The larva feeds on Onobrychis  species (O. arenaria, O. peduncularis, O. sativa and  O. viciifolia)

Subspecies
Two subspecies are recognized:
P. t. thersites (Europe, south-western Siberia, Caucasus, Armenia, Talysh Mountains, Kopet Dag)
P. t. orientis (Sheljuzhko, 1928) (Alay Mountains, northern Tian Shan, Dzhungarsky Alatau, Altai, Sayan)

thersites
Butterflies of Europe
Butterflies of Africa
Butterflies of Asia
Butterflies described in 1835